Lucien Claes (born 13 June 1923) was a Belgian wrestler. He competed in the men's Greco-Roman bantamweight at the 1952 Summer Olympics.

References

External links
 

1923 births
Possibly living people
Belgian male sport wrestlers
Olympic wrestlers of Belgium
Wrestlers at the 1952 Summer Olympics
Sportspeople from Antwerp Province